The 2011 Morgan State Bears football team represented Morgan State University in the 2011 NCAA Division I FCS football season. The Bears were led by 11th-year head coach Donald Hill-Eley and played their home games at Hughes Stadium. They were a member of the Mid-Eastern Athletic Conference (MEAC). Morgan State finished the season 5–6, 4–4 in MEAC play to finish in a tie for sixth place.

Schedule

References

Morgan State
Morgan State Bears football seasons
Morgan State Bears football